Zhenzhuquan Township is a township in northeastern part of Yanqing District, Beijing, China. It borders Qianjiadian and Baoshan Towns in its north, Liulimiao Town in its east, and Sihai Town in its southeast. It was home to 2,469 residents in 2020.

The name Zhenzhuquan comes from Zhenzhu Spring that is located within the town.

Geography 
Zhenzhuquan Township is located along the banks of Liuli River, and is surrounded by the Yan Mountain Range.

History

Administrative divisions 
By the end of 2021, Zhenzhuquan Township oversaw 16 subdivisions, with 1 of them being a community and the other 15 being villages. They are listed as follows:

See also 
 List of township-level divisions of Beijing

References

Yanqing District
Township-level divisions of Beijing